Lou Rash (born June 5, 1960) is a former defensive back in the National Football League.

Biography
Rash was born Louis Clyde Rash on June 5, 1960 in Cleveland, Mississippi.

Career
Rash played with the Philadelphia Eagles during the 1984 NFL season. After two years away from the NFL, he played with the Green Bay Packers during the 1987 NFL season.

He played at the collegiate level at Mississippi Valley State University.

See also
List of Philadelphia Eagles players
List of Green Bay Packers players

References

People from Cleveland, Mississippi
Players of American football from Mississippi
Pittsburgh Steelers players
Philadelphia Eagles players
Green Bay Packers players
American football defensive backs
Mississippi Valley State Delta Devils football players
1960 births
Living people